Antoni Szuniewicz (14 November 1911 in Leonowicze near Wilno - 12 March 1987 in Częstochowa) was a Polish organist, composer, conductor, choirmaster and music teacher. In the years 1927 to 1931 he attended the School of Professional Organists in  Montwiłła, Vilnius, then he studied at the Vilnius Conservatory of Music with Mieczysław Karłowicz, in the class of Wladyslaw Kalinowski (1932-1934), and also  composition with Tadeusz Szeligowski from 1934-1939.

References

1911 births
1987 deaths
Polish composers
Polish organists
Male organists
Polish conductors (music)
Male conductors (music)
Szuniewicz
20th-century organists
20th-century conductors (music)
20th-century male musicians
Recipient of the Meritorious Activist of Culture badge